Cross Keys (alternatively called West Gardenside) is a neighborhood in southwestern Lexington, Kentucky, United States. Its boundaries are Traveler Road to the east, Versailles Road to the north, Parks Mill Road to the north, and Lane Allen Road to the south.

Neighborhood statistics

 Area: 
 Population: 681
 Population density: 2,110 people per square mile
 Median household income (2010): $72,229

References

Neighborhoods in Lexington, Kentucky